Abbott State Forest is a  protected area located in Concord, New Hampshire, on the west side of Lake View Drive. It is bordered to the east, across Lake View Drive, by Penacook Lake water supply land. Abbott State Forest was reported to be producing white spruce seed in 1982.

See also

List of New Hampshire state forests

References

External links
 U.S. Geological Survey Map at the U.S. Geological Survey Map Website. Retrieved December 1st, 2022.

New Hampshire state forests
Concord, New Hampshire